Larry 'Jersey' O'Malley (1883–1967) was a pioneer Australian rugby league player for the Eastern Suburbs club. He was the fifth Australian rugby league captain and the second from the Eastern Suburbs Club.

Before switching codes and joining the Eastern Suburbs club in rugby league's foundation year, 1908, O'Malley played rugby union firstly for the East Borough and then the Sydney Rugby Union Clubs in 1906-07

Rugby league career
Born in Ireland in 1883, he arrived in Australia with his parents and older brother the following year aboard the Selkirkshire   as assisted immigrants. The family settled in Paddington, and Larry played rugby with the local juniors. He gained his nickname of 'Jersey' because of his red hair.

Larry 'Jersey' O'Malley played with Eastern Suburbs for six seasons: 1908, 1909 and 1911–1914, and played over 50 first grade games. He had a reputation as a tough 'no nonsense' forward.

Representative career
He made his representative début for New South Wales in rugby league's inaugural interstate match in 1908. Later that year he was selected for Australia's first 'Kangaroo Tour'. He played in 34 matches including all three Tests and was sent off twice in matches on the tour. His 34-game effort stands as the record for the most matches played on a Kangaroo tour. The following season he captained Australia in two Test Matches against New Zealand.

During the 1908 'Kangaroo Tour' O'Malley signed with the English club, Warrington for the 1910 English season. He returned to Australia and enjoying successive premierships with the Eastern Suburbs club in 1911, 1912 and 1913. He was also a member of the Eastern Suburbs side that won the City Cup in 1914.

Referee
O'Malley retired from playing the game at the end of the 1914 season but went on to become a first grade referee.

Playing record
 Club: Eastern Suburbs 1908-09 and 1911–14) 62 games, 4 tries
 Representative: Australia (1908–09) 5 Tests, and New South Wales (1908–13) 9 appearances.

References

Sources
 Whiticker, Alan (2004) Captaining the Kangaroos, New Holland, Sydney

1883 births
1967 deaths
Australian rugby league players
Australian rugby league referees
Australia national rugby league team captains
Australia national rugby league team players
New South Wales rugby league team players
Rugby league second-rows
Sydney Roosters players
Warrington Wolves players
Irish emigrants to Australia (before 1923)